Sergio Edgardo Acevedo (born 1 May 1956) is an Argentine Justicialist Party politician, formerly a provincial governor and secretary in the national government.

Life and times
Born in Esquel, Chubut Province, Acevedo moved to Pico Truncado in 1958. He became a lawyer and married, having three children. He was elected mayor of Pico Truncando in 1983, serving until 1987 when he became a provincial deputy. In 1991 he returned to be mayor. From 1995 to 1999, Acevedo was a national deputy, and became vice-governor of Santa Cruz Province under then-governor Néstor Kirchner. In 2001 he was elected once again to Congress.

Acevedo was appointed Secretary of Intelligence by President Eduardo Duhalde, serving from 2002 to mid-2003. He was confirmed by President Néstor Kirchner, but later resigned to take up the post of Governor of Santa Cruz Province, swapping positions with Héctor Icazuriaga. He was elected with almost 75% of the popular vote.

Acevedo resigned as governor in March 2006 citing personal reasons. However, his resignation came after clashes with the national government and amid controversy over police brutality in repressing the Las Heras riot and a corruption scandal involving the family of President Kirchner. The President had himself been governor of Santa Cruz and there had been allegations that public contracts were granted based on bribes and kick-backs. Members of his family held senior positions and Acevedo retained Carlos Kirchner as his provincial minister of works. He was prevented from sacking Carlos Kirchner, allegedly due to interference from Buenos Aires. A judge, the President's nephew, declined to continue the investigation and Acevedo was replaced by Carlos Sancho, vice-governor and employer of the President's son. 

It was widely speculated at the time that Acevedo resigned due to Presidential interference, in particular with oil and privatisation policy, and he has subsequently become a vocal, if equivocal, opponent of his former mentor and patron. He has set up a political faction, the Santa Cruz Coalition (Convocatoria Santacruceña), gathering together Peronists and others opposed to the Front for Victory of Kirchner and Cristina Fernández de Kirchner. Several provincial deputies and former provincial ministers joined the team. 

Following his reappearance on the political scene, there was speculation that Acevedo would run as running mate to Elisa Carrió or Adolfo Rodríguez Saá in the 2007 Presidential elections, but he ruled himself out at an early stage. His coalition, by now called 'New Movement' (Nuevo Movimiento) backed UCR Eduardo Costa for Governor of Santa Cruz, who was defeated by Kirchner's candidate Daniel Peralta in 2007, although the different opposition parties within the Change to Grow coalition fell out over the placings on the regional list for national deputies in the election. Nevertheless, Acevedo's team largely collaborated with opposition forces in municipal and provincial elections across Santa Cruz.

References

See also 
Secretaría de Inteligencia (SIDE)
List of Argentine Secretaries of Intelligence

1956 births
Living people
People from Esquel
Argentine people of Spanish descent
Justicialist Party politicians
Argentine Secretaries of Intelligence
Mayors of places in Argentina
Members of the Argentine Chamber of Deputies elected in Santa Cruz
Members of the Chamber of Deputies of Santa Cruz 
Governors of Santa Cruz Province, Argentina
Vice Governors of Santa Cruz Province, Argentina